Joanne Lesley Gilbert (7 June 1955 – 15 September 2018) was an English film producer and casting director based in Holywood, near Belfast, Northern Ireland, and ran Real Holywood Productions.

Career

Producing
At the time of her death, Jo Gilbert was in pre-production with the movie The Ribbon with Ed Burns and starring Julia Stiles ,and was producing the 40-part documentary series Great West End Theatres for Great Productions. In their review of the series, the British Theatre Guide said "This film is as close as one can get to standing on the stage taking an ovation. This series is beautifully filmed and gets the balance exactly right between classy camera work, history, reminiscence and gossip."

She produced the film Closing the Ring, the last film directed by Richard Attenborough, which was shot in and around Belfast and released in 2007.

Her previous film credits as associate producer are Puckoon (2002), directed by Terence Ryan; Darkness Falls (1999) directed by Gerry Lively; The Brylcreem Boys (1998) directed and produced  by Terence Ryan and The Mystery of Edwin Drood (1993).

She was also instrumental in originally creating the Paint Hall Film Studios in Belfast, now known as the Titanic Studios, in the Titanic Quarter, Belfast.

Casting Director
As Casting Director, her credits included The Jungle Book 2 (2003); The Second Jungle Book: Mowgli & Baloo (1997) and The Harpist (1997).

As a casting director working on the 1997 film The Brylcreem Boys for the Producer/Director Terence Ryan, they were the first film to choose the Isle of Man as a location since the 1936 film No Limit starring George Formby. Ryan based his movie there and used various locations on the island to stand-in for Ireland.

On 15 September 2018, she died of a brain tumour.

References

External links 
 

1955 births
2018 deaths
20th-century English businesspeople
21st-century English businesspeople
British casting directors
Women casting directors
English film producers
People from Leicester
Sinden family